Walter John Herbert Sprott (19 April 1897 – 2 September 1971), known to friends as ‘Sebastian’ Sprott, and also known as Jack Sprott, was a British psychologist and writer.

Life
Sprott was born 19 April 1897 at Sillwood Place, Crowborough, Sussex, to Herbert Sprott and his wife, née Mary Elizabeth Williams. He was educated at Felsted School and Clare College, Cambridge, where he became a member of the Cambridge Apostles. He was invalidated from serving in the military during the First World War and taught in preparatory schools. In the 1920s, he became acquainted with other members of the Bloomsbury Group. He was romantically involved with the economist John Maynard Keynes, who was at the time also seeing the ballerina Lydia Lopokova. Sprott's affair with Keynes ended after Keynes married Lopokova. After a job as a demonstrator at the Psychological Laboratory in Cambridge, he moved to the University of Nottingham, where he eventually became professor of philosophy.

He died on 2 September 1971 at Langham Road, Blakeney, Norfolk.

Works
 (tr.) Physique and character; an investigation of the nature of constitution and of the theory of temperament by Ernst Kretschmer, 1925. The International Library of Psychology, Philosophy and Scientific Method.
 (tr.) New introductory lectures on psycho-analysis by Sigmund Freud. New York: W.W. Norton, 1933.
 General psychology, 1937
 Sociology, 1949
 Social psychology, 1952
 Science and social action, 1954
 Human groups, 1958

See also
List of Bloomsbury Group people

References

External links
 Papers of Sprott, Walter John Herbert (1897-1971) psychologist held at King's College, Cambridge
 

1897 births
1971 deaths
British psychologists
20th-century British philosophers
German–English translators
English LGBT writers
British LGBT scientists
20th-century translators
LGBT psychologists
20th-century psychologists
20th-century English LGBT people
LGBT philosophers